The inferior labial artery (inferior labial branch of facial artery) arises near the angle of the mouth as a branch of the facial artery; it passes upward and forward beneath the triangularis and, penetrating the orbicularis oris, runs in a tortuous course along the edge of the lower lip between this muscle and the mucous membrane.

It supplies the labial glands, the mucous membrane, and the muscles of the lower lip; and anastomoses with the artery of the opposite side, and with the mental branch of the inferior alveolar artery.

Additional images

References

External links
  - "Superficial arteries of the face."
 http://www.dartmouth.edu/~humananatomy/figures/chapter_47/47-5.HTM 

Arteries of the head and neck